Heremoana Maamaatuaiahutapu is a French Polynesian civil servant, politician, and Cabinet Minister. He is a member of Tapura Huiraatira. He is the son of politician Maco Tevane and the brother of TNTV director Mateata Maamaatuaiahutapu.

Early life
Maamaatuaiahutapu was educated in Bordeaux, graduating with a diploma of advanced studies in anthropology, then returned to French Polynesia where he worked as a civil servant and then at the Polynesian Center for Human Sciences and Musée de Tahiti et des Îles. In 2002 he was appointed director of the Maison de la Culture - Te Fare Tauhiti Nui. In this role, he helped establish the International Oceanian Documentary Film Festival. In 2010, he was elected chair of GIE Tahiti Tourism.

In February 2013 he was awarded the Ordre national du Mérite.

Political career
In September 2014 he was appointed as Minister of Language Promotion, Culture, Communication and the Environment in the government of Édouard Fritch. As he was a senior civil servant at the time, he had to wait at least six months before taking up his ministerial duties. In the intervening period his portfolios were managed by Minister of Education Nicole Sanquer, and he was employed as a technical advisor in her office. He formally took office on 25 March 2015.

Following the 2018 French Polynesian legislative election in May 2018 he was reappointed as Minister of Culture and the Environment, in charge of Handicrafts. As environment minister he promoted the listing of the Marquesas Islands as a World Heritage Site and a ban on seabed mining.

References

Living people
French Polynesian civil servants
Recipients of the Ordre national du Mérite
Tapura Huiraatira politicians
Government ministers of French Polynesia
Ministers of Culture of French Polynesia
Environment ministers of French Polynesia
Year of birth missing (living people)